The 1974 Arizona State Sun Devils football team represented Arizona State University in the 1974 NCAA Division I football season.  The offense scored 267 points while the defense allowed 163 points. Led by head coach Frank Kush, the Sun Devils finished with a 7–5 record.

Schedule

Personnel

Season summary

Houston

TCU

Mark Lovett rushed for 99 yards and two touchdowns while Dennis Sproul engineered two other scoring drives in the 37–7 win.

at Missouri

at Wyoming

Utah

New Mexico

UTEP

at BYU

NC State

Colorado State

at Arizona

at Hawaii

1975 NFL Draft
The following players were claimed in the 1975 NFL Draft.

References

Arizona State
Arizona State Sun Devils football seasons
Arizona State Sun Devils football